The 2015 Mid-Season Invitational is the first event of the Mid-Season Invitational (MSI) – a League of Legends tournament organized by publisher Riot Games that was held after Spring Season, from May 7–10, 2015 at the Florida State University Donald L. Tucker Civic Center in Tallahassee, Florida. The participants is 6 winner teams of the Spring Season: 5 teams from North America (NA LCS), Europe (EU LCS), China (LPL), South Korea (LCK), Taiwan/Hong Kong/Macau (LMS) and a team from Wildcard regions (Brazil, CIS, Japan, Latin America, Oceania, Southeast Asia) that won the Mid-Season International Wildcard Invitational (IWCI).

EDward Gaming from China won the first ever MSI title after defeating SK Telecom T1 from South Korea 3–2 at the final.

Qualified teams and roster

Qualified team 

  EDward Gaming (2015 LPL Spring winner)
  SK Telecom T1 (2015 LCK Spring winner)
  Fnatic (2015 EU LCS Spring winner)
  ahq e-Sports Club (2015 LMS Spring winner)
  Team SoloMid (2015 NA LCS Spring winner)
  Beşiktaş e-Sports Club (2015 TCL Winter winner, Mid-Season International Wildcard Invitational winner)

Roster

Group stage 

 Single Round Robin, all matches are Best-of-one.
 Top 4 teams advance to Knock-out Stage.

Knock-out Stage 

 The 1st-place team plays with the 4th-place team, The 2nd-place team plays with the 3rd-place team in semifinals.
 All matches are Best-of-five.

References

2015 in esports
2015 in sports in Florida
2015 multiplayer online battle arena tournaments
2015
Sports in Tallahassee, Florida